The PAL-V Liberty is a combination of a three-wheeled car and an autogyro, or gyroplane under development by PAL-V of the Netherlands. Both a driver's license and an autogyro pilot's license are required to operate the vehicle.

Design and development
The company settled on a gyroplane design for a number of reasons. "The gyroplane principle not only provides us with a safe and easy-to-operate flying car but it also enables us to make it compact and within existing regulations, which is the most important factor to build a useable flying car," said Mike Stekelenburg, Chief Engineer at PAL-V. Pilots will require a Private pilot licence) with a gyroplane rating to fly the PAL-V Liberty.

On the ground, the propeller and rotor are stopped and power is diverted to the wheels, allowing it to travel as a three-wheeled car, which will enable easier and safer take-off and landing. In addition, it also has a high center of gravity to make it stable in the air by allowing the propeller to act through the vertical center of gravity. In 2005, new technology by Carver provided a solution for the high center of gravity issue. Their Dynamic Curve Stabilizer System ensured the road safety of the 'roadable gyroplane'.  

In 2009, PAL-V tested the tilting system with Prototype X1 on the road. After the successful test, PAL-V started to build Prototype X2, also known as the PAL-V ONE. PAL-V made its first flight with the PAL-V ONE in 2012. At that time, the company was seeking funds to develop the type for production. The estimated unit price in 2012 was around €300,000.  By proving this concept, PAL-V started the design of its first commercial flying car model, based on the proven technologies.  

In February 2017, PAL-V started its marketing campaign with the public launch of the PAL-V Liberty and announced that they had started selling the first commercial flying car. The production model was first publicly shown at the Geneva Motor Show in Switzerland on 6 March 2018.

PAL-V has 2 different versions, the Liberty Sport and the Liberty Pioneer. The Sport edition is the base model. The Pioneer edition is the limited edition model. This model will be delivered prior to any other version and includes all available options. Sport prices were expected to start from €300,000 and the Pioneer edition will be €500,000. 

After delivering 90 Pioneer Editions, PAL-V will start shipping the Sport Edition. As of March 2022 the first delivery is expected to be in 2023.

On 9 March, 2020, the company VP, international business development, Carlo Maasbommel, signed a Memorandum of Understanding with the Indian state of Gujarat, to set up a manufacturing and export plant there. At the time the company aimed to export PAL-V from India to the US, the Netherlands, the UK, etc. from 2021.

As of March 2022 the PAL-V Liberty has obtained European Road Admission for road use and agreed the flight certification basis with the European Aviation Safety Agency (EASA). PAL-V is now in the final stage of compliance demonstration, before it can be fully certified and production deliveries begun.

Specifications

Technical specifications 

 Capacity: pilot and one passenger
 Mass empty: 664 kg
Maximum Take-Off Weight (MTOW): 910 kg
 Maximum baggage load: 20 kg
 Fuel type: Euro 95, Euro 98, E10
 Fuel capacity: 100 l

Drive mode 

 Max speed: 170 km/h
 Top speed acceleration (0-100 km/h): <9 seconds
 Engine power: 100 hp
 Dimensions, L×W×H: 4 × 2 × 1,7m
 Range: 1300 km

Flight mode 

 Economic cruise speed: 140 km/h
 Max speed: 180 km/h
 Engine power: 200 hp
 Dimensions, L×W×H: 6,1 × 2 × 3,2 m
 Rotor diameter: 10,75 m
 Maximum altitude: 3500 m
Take-off distance: 180 m
 Landing roll distance: 30 m
 Range: 400-500 km

References

External links

Single-engined pusher autogyros
Roadable aircraft